"Fear" (stylized as "FEAR.") is a song by American rapper Kendrick Lamar, from his fourth studio album DAMN., released on April 14, 2017. The twelfth track on the album (third on the Collector's Edition of Damn), the song was written by Kendrick and produced by The Alchemist, with additional production by Bēkon. At seven minutes and forty-one seconds, it is the longest song on the album. Although not released as a single, the song charted in multiple countries in 2017.

The song, structured in three parts, describes events in Lamar's life, specifically his worries and fears, at the ages of seven, seventeen, twenty-seven, and at the time of recording. The song has received critical acclaim from music critics, with multiple critics calling the track as Damn's centerpiece, as well as a huge standout.

Composition 
The song begins with a voicemail from Lamar's cousin, Karni Israel Duckworth (then Carl Duckworth), who, in the voicemail, speaks a verse from the Book of Deuteronomy, the fifth book of the Torah (a section of the Hebrew Bible). Specifically, he speaks , which reads "The LORD will smite thee with madness, and with blindness, and with astonishment of heart."Duckworth, a member of the Black Hebrew Israelites, refers to the burden that Lamar feels as a result of not accepting his supposed Israeli heritage. As Duckworth mentions in his second voicemail to Lamar at the end of the song

"The so-called Blacks, Hispanics, and Native American Indians are the true children of Israel. We are the Israelites, according to the Bible. The children of Israel. He's gonna punish us for our iniquities, for our disobedience because we chose to follow other gods”

Though it is unclear how much of this logic Lamar chooses to follow, he notes in another track on the album, YAH, that “I’m an Israelite, don’t call me Black no more,” indicating sympathy towards the movement." Following Duckworth’s voicemail, the first verse sees Lamar exploring the fear he experienced as a young child with a strict mother. The second verse sees Lamar exploring his teen years expressing his fear of dying at a young age. This is enforced with the gang banging and police brutality of Compton, CA. The third verse sees Lamar exploring the anxieties he showed on his third studio album To Pimp a Butterfly. These anxieties include his lack of self-confidence in himself and his abilities, as well as the fear of losing the life he had built for himself. At the near end of the song, the beat switches and there's another verse from Carl Duckworth, a continuation of the verse in the first voicemail. Upon explaining its meaning, he ends with the Hebrew word, "shalom" meaning "peace" and "goodbye" (or greetings).

Lyrics 
The song contains "backwards vocals", also known as backmasking, or "reverse vocals". The backmasked lyrics have been described as the lyrics to the song's refrain in reverse. They appear midway through the song and occur for twenty seconds to represent Lamar going back to his childhood.

The backmasked lyrics, played forwards, reads as follows:

Critical reception 

The song has received critical acclaim from music critics, with multiple critics describing "FEAR." as DAMN.s centerpiece. Sydney Sweeney of Atwood Magazine called "Fear" a contemplative standout on DAMN. Maeve McDermott of USA Today said that with "Fear", "the album's purpose solidifies beyond its political statements, showing a portrait of an artist terrified of failure, in the eyes of his community, his peers and himself. Ryan Alfieri of DJBooth named the track as "one of [the] countless number of standout selections from his newly released opus." Writer Yoh of DJBooth described "Fear" as "the most important song on [Damn]".

Several critics have described the song's structure as similar to the 2017 Academy Award for Best Picture-winning film  Moonlight, specifically how Moonlight follows a character in three sections – childhood, adolescence, and adulthood. Because of this, Patrick Lyons of Merry Jane called Lamar "the best storyteller in hip-hop." Lawrence Burney of Vice has compared the song to Lamar's "Momma", from 2015's To Pimp a Butterfly, a track that also explores Lamar's self-actualization.

Lamar himself, in an interview with i-D Magazine, spoke highly of the track, believing some of his best verses he's ever written come from "Fear", saying "[The song's] completely honest." Lamar continued "The first verse is everything that I feared from the time that I was seven years old. The second verse I was 17. In the third, it's everything I feared when I was 27. These verses are completely honest."

Samples 
The song contains a sample of "Poverty's Paradise", written by Dale Warren and performed by 24-Carat Black from the album Ghetto: Misfortune's Wealth. According to Genius.com, the second verse contains an interpolation of rapper Beanie Sigel's song "Die", from his first studio album The Truth.

Credits and personnel 

Credits adapted from the official DAMN. digital booklet.
Kendrick Duckworth – songwriter
Daniel Alan Maman – producer, songwriter
Charles Edward Sydney Isom Jr. – additional vocals
Bēkon – additional production, additional vocals
Carl Duckworth – additional vocals
Derek Ali – mixing
Tyler Page – mixing, mix assistant
Cyrus Taghipour – mix assistant

Charts

Certifications

References

2017 songs
Kendrick Lamar songs
Songs written by Kendrick Lamar
Songs written by The Alchemist (musician)